Love or Bread is a 2008 Taiwanese drama starring Joe Cheng and Ariel Lin. It was produced by Gala Television and directed by Lin He-long. This marks the third drama that Cheng and Lin have co-starred together, after It Started with a Kiss in 2005 and its sequel They Kiss Again in 2007.

It was first broadcast in Taiwan on free-to-air China Television (CTV) from 16 November 2008 to 8 February 2009, every Sunday at 22:00 and cable TV GTV Variety Show/CH 28 on 22 November 2008 to 14 February 2009, every Saturday at 21:30.

Synopsis
Frank (Joe Cheng) is a young man who wears designer labels and thinks he's rather suave when he is actually poor. He had a tragic past and (both his parents died), he doesn't know how to handle money. He borrowed money from the loan sharks but ended up with a gang coming after him. He considers pawning his mother's wedding ring, the only thing he had left of hers, but he couldn't do it.

Zeng Shanmei (Ariel Lin) is a poor but very loving, caring, and hard working girl. She has a boyfriend, but he moves to mainland China for university and promises that they will get married after he graduates. Shanmei goes after him to China in the hope that they will finally get married. Shanmei's family is against her decision because they need her to support them, but her father literally holds off the rest of the family while yelling to Shanmei that she should go and be happy. She meets Frank while he's running from the gangsters who loaned him the money—in the ladies bathroom. Thinking that he's a pervert, she reports him to the police and he gets arrested. The ring fell out of Frank's pocket in the girls' bathroom and the policeman stuck it into Shanmei's bag. He meets Shanmei once more, this time on the road. He tries to get his ring back from her but she has no idea what he's talking about and she still thinks that he's a pervert. He doesn't get his ring, but he does get to drive her to the airport. When she reaches her destination, she meets her boyfriend and casually mentions "Xiao Bo", his best guy friend. Eventually, her boyfriend cannot take the guilt and admits to Shanmei that he betrayed her and fell for Xiao Bo, who is actually a girl.

Shanmei returns to Taiwan with no place to go. She cannot go home because her mother said when she was leaving to China that if she went then she wouldn't be considered a member of the family anymore. Her best friend, Wang Linglong (Zhang Yuchen) was constantly nagging at her not to go and even said "don't come crying to me." Shanmei decides to rent a place by using Frank's ring that the policeman had found. Her neighbouring tenant just happens to be no-one other than Frank.

When they both want money and they are complete opposites. Time came that Shanmei thinks of ending her life because there is no hope of getting back her boyfriend.

That's when Shanmei and Frank meet numerous times. But both of them are having money issues so they decide to live together. Little do they know that they both started falling in love with one another.

Cast
 Joe Cheng as Frank / Cai Jinlai 
 Ariel Lin as Zeng Shanmei 
 Ray Chang as Jin Enhao
 Zhang Yuchen as Wang Linglong 
 Huang Wen-hsing as himself 
 Lu Xiaolin as Ye Kena 
 Wu Jianfei as Jing Rong 
 Zhang Na as Xiao Bo
 Guo Ziqian as Zeng Huoshu 
 Lin Mei-hsiu as Zeng Huang Shuiliang 
 Wang Yuetang as Zeng Xiaobei 
 Yue Yaoli as Enhao's foster father
 Zhao Shun as Wan Ye
 Kuo Tzu-chien as Zeng Huo-shu

Production
In July 2008, GTV announced that lead actress Barbie Shu will be replaced by Ariel Lin. GTV stated that the drama, which was scheduled to start shooting in August, had originally cast Lin for the role of Zeng Shanmei, hence it has now returned to the actress for whom it was originally intended.

Music
 Opening theme song: "億萬克拉的幸福" (Million Dollar Happiness) by Huang Wen-hsing
 Ending theme song: "麵包的滋味" (The Taste of Bread) by Ariel Lin
Insert songs
 "If I Could" by Babyface
 "歐兜水" by Huang Wen-hsing

International broadcast
 Philippines – ABS-CBN, from June 15, 2009, every Monday to Friday 17:15.
 Japan – Television Kanagawa, Metele, Shizuoka Asahi Television, BS Japan
Thailand – Channel 7, from August 27, 2013, every Monday to Thursday  03:50.

References

External links
 GTV Love or Bread official homepage
 CTV Love or Bread official homepage

China Television original programming
Gala Television original programming
2008 Taiwanese television series debuts
2009 Taiwanese television series endings